Nils Bech (born April 8, 1981, in Hønefoss) is a Norwegian singer, signed to James Murphy's DFA Records. Bech became famous for performing a classic Christmas anthem O Holy Night for the Norwegian TV series Skam. His version of O Holy Night received more than 1 million of streams on Spotify on the day it was published, placing him in the top of the global charts.

Early life
Bech was raised in a small Norwegian village outside Oslo and began performing at a very young age when he was singing at the Salvation Army for his grandmother and her friends. At age 10, he began singing classical music and continued to do so until early 20s thinking he might do a career as an Opera singer but later moved to electropop.

Career
In 2017 Bech presented a show telling the story of his life, it was shown in Norway Opera and Ballet. He has also appeared in several theater plays including Oslo's National Theater's version of Shakespeare's Richard III where he played a singing Lord Richmond. A scene between Lady Anne and Richard was recorded for Bech's music video "Please stay".

He is a frequent guest at events hosted by Norwegian royal family. On April 7, 2017, Bech together with Norwegian ballet dancer Silas Henriksen performed "A Sudden Sickness" at the celebration of 80th birthday of Queen Sonja, and on August 29, 2018, again with Silas Henriksen he was seen in the Oslo Cathedral at the ceremony of the 50th anniversary of King and Queen of Norway wedding performing his song "Thank You". The song tells a story of his grandmother meeting his boyfriend, Bech told on Instagram.

In the past, Nils Bech has performed in the New Museum in New York and at the Venice Biennale

Personal life

Bech is openly gay.

Discography

Albums 
 2010: Look Back
 2012: Look Inside
 2014: One Year
 2016: Echo
 2020: Foolish Heart

References

External links 
 Official website

1981 births
Living people
20th-century Norwegian male singers
Norwegian LGBT singers
Norwegian gay musicians
Gay singers
People from Ringerike (municipality)